Acantholophus is a genus of beetles belonging to the family Curculionidae.

The species of this genus are found in Australia.

Species

Species:

Acantholophus adelaidae 
Acantholophus alpicola 
Acantholophus ambiguus

References

Cyclominae
Curculionidae genera